Prosolanapyrone-II oxidase (Sol5, SPS, solanapyrone synthase (bifunctional enzyme: prosolanapyrone II oxidase/prosolanapyrone III cycloisomerase), prosolanapyrone II oxidase) is an enzyme with systematic name prosolanapyrone-II:oxygen 3'-oxidoreductase. This enzyme catalyses the following chemical reaction

 prosolanapyrone II + O2  prosolanapyrone III + H2O2

This enzyme participates in the biosynthesis of the phytotoxin solanapyrone by some fungi.

References

External links 
 

EC 1.1.3